Pop's Ultimate Star was TV2's reality television show which pits former reality contestants againest each other, most of whom are former NZ Idol contestants. The show was produced by Eyeworks Touchdown, with first prize $50,000 and a Kia 'Rio' car. It is hosted by Dominic Bowden and was originally scheduled to be held in the St. James Theatre in Auckland. After damage to the St. James theatre the show was shifted to the Bruce Mason theatre before finally relocating to TVNZ's Avalon studio in Wellington.

Originally, public voting occurred from the performance show on Sunday, where the eventual two contestants who have the lowest public votes will then be in a "sing off" on Wednesday, where the judges eliminated one contestant. After week five, TVNZ changed the format and a contestant was eliminated in the Sunday night show by the judges after the two with the lowest number of public votes were chosen.

The judges are music industry veterans Peter Urlich from Th' Dudes, Jordan Luck from The Exponents, Harry Lyon from Hello Sailor and Kim Willoughby from When The Cat's Away. Lyon is the show's musical director and Willoughby the performance coach and stylist.

The show debuted on 29 May 2007, receiving mainly negative reviews, ranging from judges, song choice, lighting, singing and the most common one was the sound issue. Another controversial issue was the introduction of immunity challenges, during episodes two through four.

{| class="wikitable"
|-
! Contestant
! Placing
! Status
! Bottom 2
|-
| Joe Cotton
| Former singer – TrueBliss
Winner
|-
| Nik Carlson
| Runner-up, NZ Idol Season two
Runner-Up
|-
| Matthew Saunoa
| Winner, NZ Idol Season three
Eliminated
|-
| Emily Williams
| Runner-up, Australian Idol and singer – Young Divas
Eliminated
|Nik Carlson
|-
| David Wikaira-Paul
| Former actor – Shortland Street
Eliminated
| Nik Carlson
|-
| Ben Lummis
| Winner, NZ Idol Season one
Eliminated  
| Emily Williams
|-
| Camillia Temple
| 3rd place, NZ Idol Season one
Eliminated  
| Nik Carlson
|-
| Steve Broad
| 3rd place, NZ Idol Season two
Eliminated 
| Camillia Temple
|-
| Rosita Vai
| Winner, NZ Idol Season two
Eliminated 
| Nik Carlson
|-
| Keri Harper
| Former singer – TrueBliss
Eliminated 
| Emily Williams
|}

External links 
 Official Homepage

New Zealand popular music
2007 New Zealand television series debuts
New Zealand reality television series
New Zealand music television series
TVNZ 2 original programming